The 1997 Rolex 24 at Daytona was a 24-hour endurance sports car race held on February 1–2, 1997 at the Daytona International Speedway road course. The race served as the opening round of the 1997 IMSA GT Championship. 

Victory overall and in the WSC class went to the No. 20 Dyson Racing Riley & Scott Mk III driven by Elliott Forbes-Robinson, John Schneider, and Rob Dyson, John Paul Jr., Butch Leitzinger, Andy Wallace, and James Weaver. Victory in the GTS-1 class went to the No. 01 Rohr Corp. Porsche 911 GT2 driven by Jochen Rohr, Andy Pilgrim, Harald Grohs, and Arnd Meier. The GTS-2 class was won by the No. 99 Roock Racing Porsche 911 GT2 driven by Ralf Kelleners, Claudia Hürtgen, Patrice Goueslard, and André Ahrlé. Victory in the GTS-3 class went to the No. 10 Prototype Technology Group, Inc. BMW M3 E36 driven by Javier Quiros, Derek Hill, Boris Said, Bill Auberlen, and Tom Hessert Jr.

Race results
Class winners in bold.

References

24 Hours of Daytona
1997 in sports in Florida
1997 in American motorsport